King Dao of Zhou (died 520 BC), personal name  Ji Meng, was the twenty-fifth king of the Chinese Zhou dynasty and the thirteenth of Eastern Zhou. His given name was Měng.

Dao succeeded his father, King Jĭng of Zhou. After a reign of less than a year, he was killed by his brother Prince Chao. Following his death, the throne passed onto his brother King Jìng of Zhou.

Ancestry

See also
 Family tree of ancient Chinese emperors

Notes 

520 BC deaths
Zhou dynasty kings
6th-century BC Chinese monarchs
Year of birth unknown
6th-century BC murdered monarchs
Assassinated Chinese politicians